Yerazank Football Club, is a football club from Stepanakert, and currently participates in the Artsakh Football League.

History
It was founded during the Soviet Union in 1982. During the 1992 season, it took no part in any competition due to the Nagorno Karabakh war. In 1993, because of the ongoing war, the club was moved from Stepanakert to Yerevan.

In 1995 the club disbanded and gave its license for the 1995-96 season in the premier league to the other football club from Stepanakert, FC Karabakh Stepanakert. Although it had a brief spell in the Armenian First League in 2003, the club did not participate in any professional football league until 2018, when it entered the Artsakh Football League.

League record

References

Sport in the Republic of Artsakh